Sheka (Cyrillic: Шекә,) is a dwarf-like being in the Turkic mythology, that lives in forests or derelict houses. In the legends he uses to appear in comic situation.

Sheka in Slavic paganism is field spirit that appears as a deformed dwarf with different coloured eyes and grass instead of hair. It appears either at noon or sunset and wear either all black or all white suits. According to local beliefs it leads wandering people in a field astray, give them diseases or ride them over with horses if they are found asleep. It enjoyed pulling the hair of peasants working in the midday. It also helped little children to get lost in the cornfields. If it catches a person, forces to sing. And that lasts for hours.

References

External links 
  Türk Mitoloji Sözlüğü, Pınar Karaca (Çike)

Turkic legendary creatures
Dwarves (folklore)